Jesper Eriksson (born August 14, 1996) is a Swedish professional ice hockey goaltender. He is currently playing with Skellefteå AIK in the Swedish Hockey League (SHL)

Eriksson made his Swedish Hockey League debut playing with Skellefteå AIK during the 2014–15 SHL season.

References

External links

1996 births
Living people
Skellefteå AIK players
Swedish ice hockey goaltenders